Tomasz Valtonen (born 8 January 1980) is a Polish-born Finnish former professional ice hockey forward. He is currently the head coach for HC Pustertal Wölfe of the ICE Hockey League (ICEHL) and the Poland men's national ice hockey team. Valtonen was drafted by the Detroit Red Wings as their second-round draft pick (56th overall) in the 1998 NHL Entry Draft.

Playing career
Valtonen was born in Piotrków Trybunalski to a Polish mother and a Finnish father. The family moved to Finland when Tomek was young, and he grew up in Kitee.

He started his professional career in Ilves in 1997 and played his next season with the Plymouth Whalers in the OHL, and returned to the SM-liiga in 1999 and represented Jokerit until 2007, when he signed a two-year contract with Södertälje SK. Valtonen returned to SM-liiga and Jokerit for season 2008-2009.

Valtonen has won the SM-liiga championship, three silver medals, and the under-20s World Championship.

Coaching career
 Jokerit, A-juniors (2010–2012)
 Jokerit, (assistant coach 2012–2013 and head coach 2013–2014)
 Vaasan Sport, (2014–2018)
 Poland national ice hockey team, (2018–2020)
 Podhale Nowy Targ, (2018–2019)
 Ravensburg Towerstars (2019)
 Mora IK (2019–2020)
 HK Dukla Michalovce (2020–2022)

Career statistics

External links

1980 births
Living people
Sportspeople from Piotrków Trybunalski
Detroit Red Wings draft picks
Finnish ice hockey coaches
Finnish ice hockey left wingers
Finnish people of Polish descent
Ilves players
Jokerit players
Kiekko-Vantaa players
Plymouth Whalers players
Poland men's national ice hockey team coaches
Polish emigrants to Finland
Polish ice hockey players
Södertälje SK players